Stuart Gordon "Stu" Smith (born March 17, 1960) is a Canadian former professional ice hockey player who played 77 games in the National Hockey League for the Hartford Whalers between 1979 and 1983. The rest of his career, which lasted from 1979 to 1985, was spent in the minor American Hockey League. Internationally Smith played for the Canadian national junior team at the 1980 World Junior Championships

Smith was born in Toronto, Ontario.

Career statistics

Regular season and playoffs

International

External links
 

1960 births
Living people
Binghamton Whalers players
Canadian ice hockey defencemen
Hartford Whalers draft picks
Hartford Whalers players
New Haven Nighthawks players
Peterborough Petes (ice hockey) players
Ice hockey people from Toronto